Etan Cohen (born March 14, 1974) is an Israeli-American screenwriter and film director who has written scripts for Hollywood movies, including Tropic Thunder, Madagascar: Escape 2 Africa, Men in Black 3, and The Bad Guys.

Early life and education
Born in Israel to a Jewish family, Cohen grew up in Sharon, Massachusetts. He graduated from the Maimonides School and Harvard College, where he wrote for the Harvard Lampoon.

Career

His first produced scripts, in 1995 and 1997, were for Beavis and Butthead, where he was credited as Ethan Cohen. He has since written for other Mike Judge-directed projects, including King of the Hill from 2001 to 2005, and for the feature film Idiocracy in 2006.  In the late 1990s he worked on two other television series – the animated Recess and the short lived It's Like, You Know....  After scripting Idiocracy, he worked on the animated series, American Dad! and wrote the episode, "Failure Is Not a Factory-Installed Option".  The American Dad! minor character of the same name is named for him.

In 2008, Cohen co-wrote, along with Ben Stiller and Justin Theroux, the action-comedy film Tropic Thunder. He also wrote Madagascar: Escape 2 Africa, which earned an Annie Award nomination for best Writing in a Feature Production.

Cohen penned the script for 2012's Men in Black 3. In 2015, he made his directorial debut with Get Hard, which he also co-wrote.

Cohen wrote and directed the 2018 film Holmes & Watson. The film earned him a Golden Raspberry Award for Worst Director.

Personal life 
Cohen is an observant Jew.  He keeps kosher and does not work on the Jewish Sabbath and he and his wife send their children to a Jewish day school.

Filmography

Films

Television

Awards and nominations

References

External links 
 
https://www.rottentomatoes.com/celebrity/etan_cohen

American male screenwriters
Comedy film directors
Living people
Israeli emigrants to the United States
Israeli Jews
Jewish American screenwriters
People from Jerusalem
1974 births
DreamWorks Animation people
Maimonides School alumni
The Harvard Lampoon alumni
Harvard College alumni
People from Sharon, Massachusetts
Film directors from Massachusetts
Screenwriters from Massachusetts